Diyora Keldiyorova (born 13 July 1998) is an Uzbekistani judoka. She won the gold medal in the women's 52 kg event at the 2019 Asian-Pacific Judo Championships held in Fujairah, United Arab Emirates.

She won one of the bronze medals in the girls' 44 kg event at the 2013 Asian Youth Games held in Nanjing, China.

In 2018, she competed in the women's 48kg event at the Asian Games in Jakarta, Indonesia. She entered into the repechage after losing her second match, against Ami Kondo of Japan, and she was then eliminated from the competition in her match against Jon Yu-sun of North Korea. At the 2019 Summer Universiade held in Naples, Italy, she won one of the bronze medals in the women's 52 kg event. In the women's 52 kg event at the 2019 Military World Games held in Wuhan, China she also won one of the bronze medals.

In 2019, she won one of the bronze medals in her event at the Judo World Masters held in Qingdao, China. In 2021, she competed in the women's 52 kg event at the Judo World Masters held in Doha, Qatar. A few months later, she won the gold medal in her event at the 2021 Judo Grand Slam Antalya held in Antalya, Turkey and the silver medal at the 2021 Asian-Pacific Judo Championships held in Bishkek, Kyrgyzstan. In June 2021, she lost her bronze medal match in the women's 52 kg event at the World Judo Championships held in Budapest, Hungary.

She lost her bronze medal match in her event at the 2022 Judo Grand Slam Tel Aviv held in Tel Aviv, Israel. She won the silver medal in her event at the 2022 Judo Grand Slam Antalya held in Antalya, Turkey.

References

External links
 

Living people
1998 births
Place of birth missing (living people)
Uzbekistani female judoka
Judoka at the 2018 Asian Games
Asian Games competitors for Uzbekistan
Universiade medalists in judo
Universiade bronze medalists for Uzbekistan
Medalists at the 2019 Summer Universiade
Judoka at the 2020 Summer Olympics
Olympic judoka of Uzbekistan
21st-century Uzbekistani women